Daybreak is a 1993 American sci-fi thriller television film written and directed by Stephen Tolkin, based on the 1987 Off-Broadway play Beirut by Alan Bowne. It stars Moira Kelly, Cuba Gooding Jr., Martha Plimpton, and Omar Epps, and aired on HBO on May 8, 1993.

Plot
The film is set in the near future in a more authoritarian United States. It deals with the social persecution and criminalization of people who are infected with a sexually transmitted infection similar to HIV. Those who test positive for the disease are forcibly placed into quarantine camps. In the quarantine camps they are tattooed with a P by the authorities to indicate their positive status and shot if they try to escape. The quarantine camps are dilapidated places where patients are left to die without care or contact with the outside world.

Blue is a young woman who earns a living scavenging metal in the city. She goes with a friend who wants to be tested to a Helping Hand clinic. The clinic has the sinister slogan "Making your hard choices easier".  Outside the clinic they are given a card warning them against getting tested there. The card demands "Why is sickness a crime? Why is hospital a prison? Why does the helping hand hold a gun?". Blue is disturbed by this warning and meets an activist in the resistance called Torch.

The resistance works to prevent the quarantine of those who are positive. They arrange testing outside the official system so that they will not be quarantined. They rescue people being held by the Helping Hand clinic in order to give them medicine, care, and understanding. They distribute condoms and clean needles to help prevent the spread of the disease. This is contrasted with government advertisements for the Helping Hand clinics that threaten "The only way is not to play".

A relationship develops between Blue and Torch and it is revealed that Torch is positive. Torch is arrested because of his activism and when the police discover that he is positive they send him to quarantine. Blue sneaks into the quarantine in order to see Torch. Blue wants to be infected by Torch so that they can live together inside the quarantine camp, but Torch is reluctant to infect Blue. In the end she escapes at his urging and continues the fight on the outside.

Cast
 Moira Kelly as Blue
 Cuba Gooding Jr. as Torch
 Martha Plimpton as Laurie
 Omar Epps as Hunter
 Alice Drummond as Anna
 Amir Williams as Willie
 David Eigenberg as Bucky
 John Cameron Mitchell as Lennie
 Willie Garson as Simon
 Mark Boone Jr. as Quarantine Guard
 Deirdre O'Connell as Mom
 Jon Seda as Payne
 Phil Parolisi as Russell
 Paul Butler as Truck Driver
 Alix Koromzay as Woman in Quarantine
 Nick Chinlund as Commander
 Phil Hartman as Man in Abstinence Commercial
 John Savage as President

Production
Filming took place in New York City, including Lower Manhattan.

References

External links

1993 films
1993 science fiction films
1993 thriller films
1990s American films
1990s dystopian films
1990s English-language films
1990s political thriller films
1990s science fiction thriller films
American dystopian films
American films based on plays
American political thriller films
American science fiction television films
American science fiction thriller films
American thriller television films
Films scored by Michel Colombier
Films set in the future
Films set in the United States
Films shot in New York City
Films with screenplays by Stephen Tolkin
HBO Films films
HIV/AIDS in American films
HIV/AIDS in television